AgonSwim is a competitive swimwear manufacturer that was started by and is run by former competitive swimmers. The company is based in Nashville, Tennessee, and manufactures its suits in Valladolid, Spain. Agon is a Greek word that refers both to a struggle and to a Greek god.

AgonSwim produces swim suits for amateur aquatic sports using dye technology (dye sublimation) otherwise limited to use in professional sports like soccer, rugby union, cycling, and basketball. AgonSwim is also one of 100 competitive swimwear manufacturers approved by FINA.

CEO, Rafa Escalas was the athlete's representative on the 5-member FINA Scientific Commission for Suits.

References

External links
Official Website
SunSafe Swimwear

Swimwear manufacturers